Kurt Bryner (9 October 1916 – February 1984) was a Swiss sailor. He competed at the 1948 Summer Olympics and the 1952 Summer Olympics.

References

External links
 

1916 births
1984 deaths
Swiss male sailors (sport)
Olympic sailors of Switzerland
Sailors at the 1948 Summer Olympics – Star
Sailors at the 1952 Summer Olympics – Star
Place of birth missing